The Rue de Laborde is a street in the 8th arrondissement of Paris, France. It was built in 1788. It was named in honour of Alexandre de Laborde.

References

1788 establishments in France